First Look Media is an American nonprofit media organization founded by Pierre Omidyar in October 2013 as a venue for "original, independent journalism".

Overview
The project was started as a collaboration with Glenn Greenwald, Jeremy Scahill, and Laura Poitras with a promised $250 million in funding from Omidyar. The organization has announced plans to support multiple publications, the first of which is The Intercept, which launched in February 2014. On March 10, 2014, the company announced the addition of Gawker editor John Cook as editor-in-chief of The Intercept, as well as Natasha Vargas-Cooper and Andrew Jerrell Jones as writers for the site. In June 2014, it was announced that Morgan Marquis-Boire was joining First Look Media as the Director of Security.

A second publication was announced in February 2014 that would focus on financial and political corruption, headed by Matt Taibbi. Although the name of the publication has not been publicly announced, the name Racket has been reportedly chosen. The publication was to be launched autumn 2014 but in October, it was reported that Taibbi was on leave after "disagreements with higher-ups". On October 28, Omidyar stated in a press release that Taibbi had left First Look.

In December 2014, First Look Media announced the launch of Reported.ly, a social media news service led by Andy Carvin. However, in August 2016, Reported.ly said FLM has "chosen to part ways with us," and was planning to shut down.

In February 2015, senior investigative reporter Ken Silverstein, who had been hired in December 2013, announced his resignation. Writing in Politico, Silverstein described First Look as "a slowly unfolding disaster, not because of editorial meddling from the top, but because of what I came to believe was epic managerial incompetence. …For all of the bean counting and expense account-approving that Omidyar's organizational structure imposed on us, they were shockingly disinterested in the actual journalism. …Top management was so aloof that it was hard to figure out who was in charge."

In January 2015, Betsy Reed joined as the editor in chief of The Intercept, replacing John Cook. Shortly thereafter, she hired Charlotte Greensit as managing editor in April 2015.

In February 2016 First Look Media announced they would be partnering with Matt Bors to relaunch The Nib.

In 2017, First Look Media launched the photo and video website Topic.com. Topic Studios was also launched as part of this. They have helped produce Roman J. Israel, Esq., Risk, Spotlight and Leave No Trace.

In May 2017, First Look Media relaunched the Press Freedom Defense Fund to fund first amendment court cases.

In June 2019, First Look Media decided to stop funding The Nib and laid off its staff as of the end of July 2019.

On October 29, 2020, Glenn Greenwald announced his resignation from The Intercept and First Look Media, citing editorial censorship of his story concerning the Biden–Ukraine conspiracy theory and allegations concerning Joe Biden's conduct with regard to China, and also citing attempted interference with his contractual right to publish rejected stories elsewhere. Greenwald published his resignation letter and rebuttal on Substack. Betsy Reed, The Intercept's editor-in-chief, disputed Greenwald's accusations and claims of censorship, and accused him of presenting dubious claims by the Trump campaign as journalism.

On November 30, 2020, Laura Poitras was fired by First Look Media, allegedly in relation to the Reality Winner controversy. More recently, the Topic Studios unit of First Look Media inked a first look deal with Loveless.

On January 9, 2023, The Intercept announced that it would restructure as an independent non-profit organization, with financial help from First Look.

Podcasts
First Look Media began partnering to produce podcasts in 2016. Shows include:

 Politically Re-Active with W. Kamau Bell & Hari Kondabolu (with Earwolf)
 Intercepted with Jeremy Scahill (with Panoply Media)
 Maeve in America—hosted by Maeve Higgins (with Panoply Media)
 Missing Richard Simmons—hosted by Dan Taberski (with Pineapple Street Media)
 Deconstructed with Ryan Grim
 Murderville, GA with Liliana Segura and Jordan Smith
 Running From Cops with Dan Taberski

References

External links 
 

Mass media companies of the United States
Charities based in New York City
Internet properties established in 2013